Chamaelaucium virgatum is a member of the family Myrtaceae endemic to Western Australia.

It blooms in between August and January producing white-pink flowers.

Found on sand plains in an area extending from the southern Wheatbelt and into the south western Goldfields-Esperance regions of Western Australia where it grows in sandy or gravelly soils over laterite.

References

virgatum
Plants described in 1838